Myron Reed may refer to:
 Myron Reed (politician), American senator
 Myron Reed (wrestler), American professional wrestler
 Myron W. Reed (1836–1899), American political activist